Movies Now is an Indian Movies channel featuring Hollywood films. It was launched on 19 December 2010 with a picture quality of 1080i and 5.1 surround sound. It is also available in Tamil feed for specific movies. The channel is owned by The Times Group.

In June 2016, Times Network decided to launch another channel called Movies Now 2, which later renamed as MNX.

In July 2017, Movies Now 2 was rechristened into MNX channel in Hollywood. It has exclusive content licensing from films produced or distributed by MGM and has content licensing from Walt Disney Studios, Marvel Studios, 20th Century Studios, Paramount Pictures, Universal Studios, Warner Bros, Lionsgate,

See also 
 HBO Asia
 &flix
 Sony Pix

References

External links
 Official website

Movie channels in India
Mass media in Southeast Asia
Television stations in Mumbai
Television channels and stations established in 2010
English-language television stations in India
Television channels of The Times Group
2010 establishments in Maharashtra